Enprazepine is a tricyclic antidepressant (TCA) which was never marketed.

See also 
 Tricyclic antidepressant

References 

Dimethylamino compounds
Dibenzazepines
Tricyclic antidepressants
Abandoned drugs
Vinylidene compounds